Racing is a Peruvian football club, playing in the city of Huamachuco, Peru. The club was founded 1946 and play in the Copa Perú which is the third division of the Peruvian league.

History
In the 2014 Copa Perú, the club classified to the Regional Stage, but was eliminated by Sport Rosario in the group stage.

In the 2015 Copa Perú, the club classified to the National Stage, but was eliminated by DIM in the Round of 16.

In the 2016 Copa Perú, the club classified to the National Stage - final stage, but was eliminated by Sport Rosario.

Stadium
Racing play their home games in Estadio Municipal de Huamachuco in downtown Huamachuco, the stadium's capacity was expanded to 5,000.

Honours

Regional
Liga Departamental del La Libertad:
Winners (3): 2015, 2016, 2018
Runner-up (2): 1981, 2014

Liga Provincial de Sánchez Carrión:
Winners (26): 1947, 1949, 1953, 1956, 1960, 1962, 1966, 1970, 1973, 1974, 1977, 1978, 1982, 1985, 1986, 1987, 1988, 1993, 1996, 2001, 2003, 2006, 2008, 2015, 2018, 2022
Runner-up (6): 2010, 2011, 2012, 2013, 2014, 2016

Liga Distrital de Huamachuco:
Winners (3): 2015, 2018, 2022
Runner-up (2): 2013, 2014

See also
List of football clubs in Peru
Peruvian football league system

References

External links
 Official Website

Racing de Huamachuco
Association football clubs established in 1946
Copa Perú